The 1971 Canadian Ladies Curling Association Championship, the Canadian women's curling championship was held February 22 to 26, 1971 at Memorial Stadium, in St. John's, Newfoundland.

For the second consecutive year, there would be a three-way tiebreaker playoff to determine the championship as Alberta, British Columbia, and Saskatchewan all finished round robin play with 6–3 records. Team Saskatchewan, who was skipped by Vera Pezer captured the championship by defeating both British Columbia 10–7 in the semifinal and Alberta 9–2 in the final. This was Saskatchewan's fourth championship and third in a row. This would be the first of three straight titles for Pezer.

The event had particularly good ice conditions for the time, due in part to cool weather and small crowds. The small crowds were blamed on a lack of a middle class in Newfoundland, and the small numbers of curlers in the province.

British Columbia's 3–2 victory over Saskatchewan in Draw 5 set two tournament records for the fewest combined points scored between two teams in one game (5) and the most blank ends in one game (5). The lowest combined score would be matched four more times (and twice in ).

The Nova Scotia rink ended up becoming the third team to finish round robin play winless. At the time, the team set tournament records for most points allowed (112), fewest points scored (43), and worst point differential (-69).

Teams
The teams were as follows:

Round Robin standings
Final Round Robin standings

Round Robin results
All times are listed in Newfoundland Standard Time (UTC-03:30).

Draw 1
Monday, February 22, 2:30 pm

Draw 2
Monday, February 22, 8:00 pm

Draw 3
Tuesday, February 23, 2:30 pm

Draw 4
Tuesday, February 23, 8:00 pm

Draw 5
Wednesday, February 24, 9:30 am

Draw 6
Wednesday, February 24, 2:30 pm

Draw 7
Wednesday, February 24, 8:00 pm

Draw 8
Thursday, February 25, 2:30 pm

Draw 9
Thursday, February 25, 8:00 pm

Playoff

Semifinal
Friday, February 26, 9:30 am

Final
Friday, February 26, 2:30 pm

References

Scotties Tournament of Hearts
1971 in Canadian curling
Sport in St. John's, Newfoundland and Labrador
1971 in Newfoundland and Labrador
February 1971 sports events in North America